The International College– Athens Campus. It operated from 1989 to July 2014.

History
The International College was founded in 1989 by Dr. Peter Myrian, Dr. Nicos Peristanis, and Dr. Andreas Polemitis as a non profit educational institution with Peter Myrian as its Director. It initially offered college courses in Athens, Greece, in Business Administration and Psychology, with Dr. Peter Myrian as its president. Under this educational co-operation both institutions flourished with UIA reaching an enrollment of approximately 500 students at the retirement of Peter Myrian (1989–2004).

The campus was located in the shadow of the Acropolis, in the historic Plaka neighbourhood of central Athens.

In April 2013, UIndy announced that, because of declining enrolment and revenue related to economic problems in Greece, all undergraduate programs and most graduate programs would be phased out as of August 31, 2013. The college ceased operations in July 2014.

External links
 

Private universities and colleges in Greece
Education in Athens
University of Indianapolis
Satellite campuses
Defunct universities and colleges in Greece
1989 establishments in Greece
Educational institutions established in 1989
2014 disestablishments in Greece
Educational institutions disestablished in 2014